McKay, MacKay or Mackay is a Scottish surname. The last phoneme in the name is traditionally pronounced to rhyme with 'eye', but in some parts of the world this has come to rhyme with 'hey'. In Scotland, it corresponds to Clan Mackay. Notable people with the surname include:

A
 Adam McKay
 Aeneas Mackay (1839-1909), Prime Minister of the Netherlands, member and president of the Dutch House of Representatives
 Al McKay
 Alan Lindsay Mackay
 Alexander McKay (disambiguation)
 Alfred Edwin McKay
 Allen McKay
 Ami McKay
 Andrew McKay
 Andrew McKay (actor)
 Andy McKay
 Andy Mackay
 Angus McKay (disambiguation)
 Antonio McKay

B
 Barrie McKay
 Ben McKay (disambiguation)
 Bill McKay (disambiguation)
 Billy Mckay
 Bob McKay
 Bobby McKay
 Brad McKay (doctor)
 Brendan McKay (born 1995), American baseball player

C
 Callum McKay
 Charles McKay
 Charles Mackay (disambiguation)
 Cheryl McKay
 Christopher McKay (planetary scientist)
 Clan McKay
 Clarence Mackay (1874–1938), American financier
 Claude McKay
 Clint McKay
 Cody McKay
 Colin McKay
 Craig McKay (disambiguation)

D
 Daniel MacKay
 Daniel McKay
 Daithí McKay
 David McKay (disambiguation)
 Derek McKay
 Don McKay (disambiguation)
 Donald McKay
 Donald McKay (politician)
 Doreen McKay
 Doug McKay (public servant)
 Douglas McKay
 Douglas I. McKay
 Dryden McKay (born 1997), American ice hockey goaltender
 Duncan McKay (disambiguation) 
 Dylan McKay, a fictional character from Beverly Hills, 90210

E
 Elsie Mackay, aka 'Poppy Wyndham', English actress and pioneering aviator
 Elsie Mackay (actress), Broadway and film actress in the 1920s–30s
 Ernie McKay

F
 Freddie McKay
 Fulton Mackay

G
 Gardner McKay
 George McKay (disambiguation)
 Glenda McKay
 Gordon W. McKay

H
 Hamish McKay
 Heather McKay (born 1941), Australian squash player
 Hec McKay
 Helen Mackay (sculptor) (1897–1973), British artist
 Helen McKay, dance band singer
 Helen McKay (plant physiologist)
 Henry D. McKay
 Hilary McKay
 Hilda Mabel McKay (1893-1987), Australian welfare worker and philanthropist
 Hugh Victor McKay
 Hugh Mackay, 14th Lord Reay (1937–2013)
 Hunter McKay

I
 Ian McKay (disambiguation):
 Iven Giffard Mackay, Australian World War II general

J
 J. Curtis McKay, American legislator
 Jack McKay (footballer, born 1885)
 Jack McKay (footballer, born 1996)
 James McKay (disambiguation):
 Jason McKay
 Jessie McKay (born 1989), Australian professional wrestler, ring name Billie Kay
 Jim McKay (1921–2008), professional name of American sportscaster James McManus
 Jim McKay (director)
 Jodi McKay
 John MacKay (disambiguation)
 Julian MacKay

K
 K. Gunn McKay (1925–2000), American politician
 Katherine Mackay (1901–1975), Australian police officer 
 Katherine Duer Mackay (1878–1930), American suffragist and socialite
 Katrine Mackay (1864–1944), New Zealand journalist, novelist and cook
 Kevin McKay (artist) (born 1966), Australian artist

L
 Leo McKay, Jr.
 Lathan McKay

M
 Malky Mackay (born 1972), Scottish footballer and manager
 Malky Mackay (footballer, born 1942), Scottish footballer
 Margaret MacKay (1903–1998), New Zealand lawyer
 Margaret McKay
 Maureen McKay
 Matt McKay
 McKay Christensen
 Megan McKay, basketball player 
 Mekale McKay (born 1993), American football player
 Mhairi McKay (born 1975), Scottish golfer
 Michael McKay (disambiguation)
 Molly McKay
 Mungo McKay
 Muriel McKay (1914–1970), Australian murder victim

N
 Natasha McKay
 Nellie McKay
 Nellie Y. McKay
 Nicholas McKay (disambiguation)

P
 Pat McKay, Scottish martial artist
 Patrick McKay (born 1980/1981), American screenwriter
 Patricia McKay
 Peter McKay (footballer), Scottish footballer
 Peter McKay (Australian politician)
 Peter Mackay, 4th Earl of Inchcape (born 1943)
 Peter MacKay, Canadian politician (born 1965)

R
 R. J. McKay, Australia-born biologist
 Randy McKay, Canadian retired ice hockey player 
 Ray McKay, former ice hockey player
 Raymond McKay (1925–1993), American labor leader
 Rich McKay, president of the Atlanta Falcons
 Ritchie McKay, American basketball coach
 Roderick McIntosh McKay, Scottish chess master
 Rodney McKay, a character from Stargate Atlantis
 Roy McKay (baseball) (1933–1995), baseball pitcher

S
 Sally McKay Artist
 Sandra Lee McKay, Professor Emeritus of San Francisco State University
 Scott McKay, a Canadian politician
 Scott McKay (actor), American actor
 Serena McKay (1997–2017), a Canadian woman who was brutally murdered and her murder posted online
 Shane McKay, a character from Degrassi
 Simon Mackay, Baron Tanlaw (born 1934), member of the House of Lords
 Sophie McKay, a character from Shortland Street
 Stephanie McKay, American soul singer and songwriter
 Stephen McKay, British Professor in Social Research

T
 Thomas McKay (disambiguation):
 Tim McKay

W
 William McKay
 Willie McKay

See also
 All pages beginning with Mckay
 All pages beginning with Mackay
 Nautyn McKay-Loescher
 McKay's approximation for the coefficient of variation
 Mackay (disambiguation), includes a list of people with the surname
 Mackey (disambiguation)
 Mackeys (disambiguation)
 McKey (disambiguation)

References

Surnames of Irish origin
Surnames of Scottish origin